The City of Ballaarat was a local government area covering the inner suburbs of the regional city of Ballarat, Victoria, Australia.

History

The spelling of the name was a source of constant confusion. It originated from two Aboriginal words "balla arat", meaning "resting place". The municipality used the spelling Ballaarat as part of its corporate description, but the town itself came to be known as Ballarat.

Ballaarat originated in two boroughs, incorporated two years apart; the Borough of Ballaarat was first incorporated on 10 December 1855, becoming a town on 10 October 1863 and a city on 9 September 1870. The Borough of Ballaarat East, meanwhile, came into being on 1 May 1857 and became a town on 23 August 1872. It was divided into North, Central and South wards in 1889. On 25 May 1921, the town merged into Ballaarat, which was redivided into four wards. On 2 April 1930, the combined entity absorbed part of the Shire of Bungaree.

On 6 May 1994, the City of Ballaarat was abolished, and along with the Borough of Sebastopol, the Shire of Ballarat and parts of the Shires of Bungaree, Buninyong, Grenville and Ripon, was merged into the newly created City of Ballarat.

Wards

The City of Ballaarat was divided into four wards on 25 May 1921, each of which elected three councillors:
 Lake Ward
 Park Ward
 Black Hill Ward
 Eureka Ward

Towns and localities
 Bakery Hill
 Ballarat Central*
 Ballarat East
 Black Hill
 Canadian
 Eureka
 Golden Point
 Lake Gardens
 Lake Wendouree
 Lucas
 Mount Clear
 Mount Pleasant
 Newington
 Redan
 Soldiers Hill

* Council seat.

Population

* Estimate in the 1958 Victorian Year Book.

References

External links
 Victorian Places - Ballarat City

Ballaarat City
1855 establishments in Australia